Cherokee Christian Schools is a private Christian school in Woodstock, Georgia, United States enrolling students from kindergarten through 12th grade. Its primary organization includes the Academy (kindergarten, elementary, and middle) and the High School. The Administration  of CCS includes a board of directors, a superintendent, and principals of the elementary, middle school and high school. It is a traditional school, in that students attend five days a week and follow a period schedule and calendar similar to local public schools.

History
The school was originally established in 1985 under the auspices of the session of Cherokee Presbyterian Church (PCA) in an effort to establish a Biblical alternative to secular, public schooling utilizing a traditional education model.  The organizer and first headmaster was state certified educator, Denise D. Michelson, who also served as the chairman of the school board for the next 12 years.  The school initially met in a house and had an enrollment of 35 children.  As the school grew, grade-levels were added yearly until, in 1997 it added the 12th grade and saw the first graduating class. For financial reasons, the high school was terminated two years later, followed by a hiatus of nine years, but has since been re-established and is now in separate high school facilities on another part of the campus.

Campus and facilities
When the school outgrew the initial facilities also housing Cherokee Presbyterian Church facilities, the school relocated to its current site at Trickum Road, Woodstock, Georgia. The school's facilities have progressively expanded and now include an elementary building, with a fine-arts wing and a middle-school wing, a separate high school building, and athletic fields. The school recently acquired an adjacent property, nearly doubling the available campus acreage, with long-range plans to include a separate fine-arts building.

References

External links
 

Christian schools in Georgia (U.S. state)
Schools in Cherokee County, Georgia
Private high schools in Georgia (U.S. state)
Private middle schools in Georgia (U.S. state)
Private elementary schools in Georgia (U.S. state)
Educational institutions established in 1986
1986 establishments in Georgia (U.S. state)